AGLS may refer to:

 Atlanta Gas Light Services
 Australian Government Locator Service, Australian metadata standard, AS 5044-2010
 Automatic Gun Laying System